Directional-change intrinsic time  is an event-based operator to dissect a data series into a sequence of alternating trends of defined size . 

The directional-change intrinsic time operator was developed for the analysis of financial market data series. It is an alternative methodology to the concept of continuous time. Directional-change intrinsic time operator dissects a data series into a set of drawups and drawdowns or up and down trends that alternate with each other. An established trend comes to an end as soon as a trend reversal is observed. A price move that extends a trend is called overshoot and leads to new price extremes. 

Figure 1 provides an example of a price curve dissected by the directional change intrinsic time operator. 

The frequency of directional-change intrinsic events maps (1) the volatility of price changes conditional to (2) the selected threshold . The stochastic nature of the underlying process is mirrored in the non-equal number of intrinsic events observed over equal periods of physical time. 

Directional-change intrinsic time operator is a noise filtering technique. It identifies regime shifts, when trend changes of a particular size occur and hides price fluctuations that are smaller than the threshold .

Application 
The directional-change intrinsic time operator was used to analyze high frequency foreign exchange market data and has led to the discovery of a large set of scaling laws that have not been previously observed. The scaling laws identify properties of the underlying data series, such as the size of the expected price overshoot after an intrinsic time event or the number of expected directional-changes within a physical time interval or price threshold. For example, a scaling relating the expected number of directional-changes  observed over the fixed period to the size of the threshold :

,

Other applications of the directional-change intrinsic time in finance include:

 trading strategy characterised by the annual Sharpe ratio 3.04
 tools designed to monitor liquidity at multiple trend scales.

The methodology can also be used for applications beyond economics and finance. It can be applied to other scientific domains and opens a new avenue of research in the area of BigData.

References 

Data analysis